Felix Bondaluke (born December 10, 1986) is a Papua New Guinean footballer who plays as a defender.

References 

Living people
1986 births
Papua New Guinean footballers
Papua New Guinea international footballers
2012 OFC Nations Cup players
Association football defenders